Illam, also referred to as Mana, is the Malayalam word for the house of a Namboodiri Brahmin. In the traditional lineage system used for the classification and identification of homes based on the castes of Kerala, South India, an Illam served as the Tharavad (ancestral house) of Namboodiri Brahmin families. 

The Namboodiris, who constituted the highest ranking caste of Kerala, also refer to their lineages as the Brahmaalayam. The family homes are built according to the canons of Vaasthusaasthram, meaning "architecture" in the Sanskrit language.

Structural layout 

The traditional layout of a Namboodiri Illam is in the form of an open courtyard which is located in the middle, known as the Nadumittam ('nadu' meaning middle and 'mittam' meaning earth/ground). These buildings or houses are designed in different patterns such as Nalukettu (a courtyard surrounded by rooms on four sides), Ettukettu (a nalukettu surrounded by another nalukettu), and Pathinarukettu (four layers of buildings constructed around a central courtyard).

Popular examples 

Some well-known Illams in Kerala include Suryakaladi Mana (Kottayam), Varikkasseri Mana (Palakkad), Pootheri Illam (Feroke), Eettisseri Mana (Kannur), Nenmini Illam (Guruvayur), Olappamanna Illam (Vellinezhi) and Poomulli Mana (Palakkad). Most of these ancestral homes produced aristocratic families who have since married with elite Nair communities to form the upper-caste divisions.

References
https://www.namboothiri.com/articles/illam.htm

https://www.keralatourism.org/destination/poonthanam-illam-kizhattoor-perinthalmanna/393
Culture of Kerala
Architecture in India